Bryotropha nupponeni is a moth of the family Gelechiidae. It is found in the southern Ural region of Russia.

The wingspan is 12–13 mm. The forewings are fuscous brown and the hindwings are pale fuscous, but darker towards the apex. Adults have been recorded on wing from June to July.

Etymology
The species is named in honour of Mr. K. Nupponen who provided the authors with the type series of the species.

References

Moths described in 2005
nupponeni
Moths of Europe